Agori Khas railway station (station code AGY) is a small railway station located in Robertsganj, Sonbhadra district, Uttar Pradesh, India. It serves Robertsganj town.

Major trains
 Shaktinagar Terminal–Bareilly Triveni Express

See also 

 Northern Railway zone

References 

Railway stations in Sonbhadra district
Allahabad railway division
Robertsganj